Eik is a neighborhood in the northern part of the town of Tønsberg, located in the municipality of Tønsberg, Norway. It is the home of the football club Eik-Tønsberg.

Villages in Vestfold og Telemark
Tønsberg